Flight 706 may refer to:

 Northwest Orient Airlines Flight 706 (1961, Chicago O'Hare), Lockheed L-188 Electra crashed on take-off — maintenance error 
 Hughes Airwest Flight 706 (1971, California), a DC-9 passenger jet collided with F-4 Phantom fighter jet
 British European Airways Flight 706 (1971, Belgium), spun out of control — corrosion caused rear pressure bulkhead failure 
 Air Vietnam Flight 706 (1974, South Vietnam), hijacked and crashed
 Proteus Airlines Flight 706 (1998, France), a Beechcraft collided with a Cessna whose transponder was switched off
(all 706 Flights with no survivors)
0706